Moustapha Bayal Sall (born 30 November 1985) is a Senegalese professional footballer who plays as a centre-back for Jordanian club Al Faisaly SC. At international level, he has represented Senegal, earning 29 caps and scoring one goal.

Playing career
In March 2007 Bayal Sall signed a contract with IK Start. But three months later, having never played a game for the club, he signed for AS Saint-Étienne. Start brought the matter to FIFA and on 3 December 2007 Sall was handed a four-month ban due to start in July 2008 and Saint-Étienne were ordered to pay $150,000 in compensation to the Norwegian club.

In January 2012 Bayal Sall went on a six-month loan to AS Nancy-Lorraine.
He was put aside by the management in Saint-Étienne, according to him because of personal problems with manager Christophe Galtier, and therefore not playing anymore.

He joined Qatari club Al-Arabi during the summer of 2016.

He agreed the termination of his contract with Royal Antwerp of the Belgian First Division A in April 2018.

A free agent since leaving Antwerp, Bayall Sall returned to France joining Championnat National side AS Lyon-Duchère in July 2019.

In April 2021, he signed a contract with Al Faisaly of Jordan.

Honours
Saint-Étienne
French League Cup: 2012–13

References

Living people
1985 births
Footballers from Dakar
Association football defenders
Senegalese footballers
Senegalese expatriate footballers
Senegal international footballers
2008 Africa Cup of Nations players
Ligue 1 players
Qatar Stars League players
Belgian Pro League players
Championnat National players
Championnat National 2 players
US Gorée players
AS Nancy Lorraine players
AS Saint-Étienne players
Al-Arabi SC (Qatar) players
Royal Antwerp F.C. players
Lyon La Duchère players
2012 Africa Cup of Nations players
Expatriate footballers in Qatar
Expatriate footballers in Belgium
Senegalese expatriate sportspeople in Qatar
Senegalese expatriate sportspeople in Belgium